Sir Philip Herbert Hanson  (18 September 1871 – 23 October 1955) was a British civil servant, who later served in the Irish Free State.

Hanson was born in Bradford, Yorkshire. He was educated at the Royal High School, Edinburgh, the University of Edinburgh, and Balliol College, Oxford, where he took a first in Greats. In 1895 he entered the Civil Service and joined the War Office.

From 1898 to 1903 he served as private secretary to George Wyndham as Under-Secretary of State for War and then Chief Secretary for Ireland. In 1903 he was appointed a Commissioner of Public Works in Ireland, serving with the Commission of Public Works until his retirement in 1934, except between 1915 and 1919 when he served with the Ministry of Munitions as Director-General of Contracts, Head of the American Department and Ministry Representative in Paris. He was chairman of the Commission of Public Works from 1927 to 1934.

Already a Companion of the Order of the Bath (CB), he was knighted in the 1920 New Year Honours for his work with the Ministry of Munitions.

He continued to live in Dublin until his death.

In 1914 he married Constance Geraldine Tyrrell, who became a prominent Dublin hostess.

Footnotes

References
Obituary, The Times, 25 October 1955

External links
 

1871 births
1955 deaths
People from Bradford
People educated at the Royal High School, Edinburgh
Alumni of the University of Edinburgh
Alumni of Balliol College, Oxford
Civil servants in the War Office
Private secretaries in the British Civil Service
Civil servants in Ireland (1801–1922)
Civil servants in the Ministry of Munitions
Irish civil servants
Knights Bachelor
Companions of the Order of the Bath